Radio Belarus (Belarusian: Радыё "Беларусь") was the official international broadcasting station of Belarus. The station has ceased broadcasting on shortwave and mediumwave as of 1 April 2016.

History
Radio Belarus has broadcast on the international shortwave bands since 11 May 1962. Originally the programs were broadcast in Belarusian. In 1985, broadcasting in German was launched, and in 1998 they began broadcasting Russian and English versions. Since 2006 the radio has started broadcasting in Polish, while 2010 saw the launch of French and Spanish language programming. Programming in Chinese started in 2013 and in Arabic in 2017. 

The station used to offer 16 hours of radio content in 9 languages and 10 hours of real-time online English programming daily.

Radio "Belarus" features
 News and information-analytical shows
 Radio interviews with statesmen, politicians, public and religious figures; scientists, writers and musicians, masters of art and folklore; sportsmen
 Programs about history, culture, and spiritual values of Belarusians

The radio carries shows about different aspects of Belarusian life and human interest stories about ordinary Belarusian families.  Priority in music policy is examples of folk, classical, and modern Belarusian music.

Former shortwave band
 14:00–02:00 local time (11:00–23:00 UTC) at 7390, 7360 kHz
 20:05–02:00 local time (17:05–23:00 UTC) at 6155 kHz

Former medium wave band
 22:00–02:00 local time (19:00–23:00 UTC) at 1170 kHz

FM transmitters and frequencies

 Brest 96.4 MHz
 Grodno 96.9 MHz
 Svislach 100.8 MHz
 Heraniony 99.9 MHz
 Braslaw 106.6 MHz
 Miadzel 102.0 MHz

Internet broadcasting
Radio "Belarus" started on-line Internet broadcasts in the English language on January 3, 2005. On September 1, 2005, it increased the air time from 5 to 10 hours, including two 5-hour blocks.

Online broadcasting schedule
 On-line: 02:00–07:00, 15:00–20:00 local time
 Rerun: 07:00–12:00, 12:00–14:00, 20:00–01:00 local time

References

External links
 Radio Belarus Website 
 Internet broadcast schedule 

Radio stations in Belarus
International broadcasters
Radio stations established in 1962
Radio stations disestablished in 2016
Defunct mass media in Belarus